Drive On is a 1975 album by British band Mott (one year before,  named Mott the Hoople). It was released on the CBS label in the UK and the Columbia label in the United States. A remastered version was released in CD format in 2006 by Wounded Bird Records in US. It's the first album without former lead singer Ian Hunter, and includes two new members: Ray Major and Nigel Benjamin.
 
The album features the singles "Monte Carlo / Shout It All Out" and 	"By Tonight / I Can Show You How It Is".

Background 
In the afterglow of The Hoople (1974), a live album Live was quickly released, after which the guitarist Ariel Bender was replaced by Mick Ronson. Mott The Hoople ended when vocalist/songwriter/guitarist Hunter left the group to form a solo band, with accompaniment from Ronson.

In January 1975, Ray Major and lead singer Nigel Benjamin were added to continue the group, which abbreviated its name to Mott. The new line-up consisted of Pete Watts, Dale Griffin and Morgan Fisher, along with guitarists Major (formerly of Opal Butterfly, Hackensack, and a brief stint with Andy Fraser and Frankie Miller) and the relatively unknown Benjamin.

Watts did the lion's share of songwriting, supplemented by Griffin and Major. Mott "arranged, produced and directed" Drive On, and it was co-engineered by Geoff Emerick.

This line-up released only one more album, Shouting and Pointing (1976), which also sold poorly. Drive On was the last studio album in British charts for the band.

Track listing
All tracks written by Pete Overend Watts, except where noted.

LP version

Side one
"By Tonight" – 3:46
"Monte Carlo" – 4:35
"She Does It" – 3:26 
"I'll Tell You Something" – 4:30
"Stiff Upper Lip"	4:30

Side two
"Love Now" – 2:45 
"Apologies" (Ray Major) – 0:50
"The Great White Wail" – 5:06 
"Here We Are" – 5:25
"It Takes One To Know One" (Dale Griffin) – 4:30 
"I Can Show You How It Is" (Watts, Griffin) – 2:30

Personnel
Mott
 Nigel Benjamin – lead vocals (tracks 1-4, 7-11), backing vocals (tracks 5, 6, 11) acoustic guitar (track 7)
 Ray Major – lead guitar (tracks 2-6, 8-11), rhythm guitar (tracks 2, 3, 10), slide guitar (track 1), backing vocals (track 10)
 Morgan Fisher – piano (tracks 1-6, 9-11), synthesizer (tracks 2-4, 8), organ (tracks 2, 4, 10), Davolisint (tracks 2, 8), electric piano (tracks 4, 8, 9, 11), backing vocals (tracks 2, 5, 10), glockenspiel (track 5), bass (track 8)
 Pete Overend Watts – bass (tracks 1-6, 9-11), rhythm guitar (tracks 1, 5, 6, 8, 10), backing vocals (track 2, 3), lead vocals (tracks 5, 6), acoustic guitar (track 9)
 Dale "Buffin" Griffin – drums (tracks 1-6, 8-11), backing vocals (tracks 2, 6)
Additional personnel
 Stan Tippins – backing vocals (tracks 2, 10, 11)

Technical
 Mott – producer, arranger
 Alan Harris, Geoff Emerick, Ron Fawcus – engineers 
 Arun Chakraverty – mastering
 Art Direction – Roslav Szaybo
 Gary Edwards, Geoff Emerick, Pete Henderson – mixing engineers
 Mike Putland, Peter Lavery – photography 
 Roger Bamber – photography [Front Cover]

Charts

References

External links
Drive On review
Drive On at Discogs

Mott the Hoople albums
1975 albums
Columbia Records albums